Eric Francis Osborn (1922–2007) was an Australian minister and theologian. He was the Professor of New Testament and Early Church History at the Theological Hall of Queen's College in Melbourne, Australia.

Selected publications 
 
 The Emergence of Christian Theology (Cambridge University Press: 2005)
 Clement of Alexandria (Cambridge University Press: 2008)
He died in 2007

References

External links 

Australian Christian theologians
1922 births
2007 deaths
Academic staff of the University of Melbourne